Ithu Engal Neethi is a 1988 Indian Tamil-language vigilante action film, directed by S. A. Chandrasekhar and produced by S. S. Neelakandan and Shoba Chandrasekhar. The film stars Ramki, Raadhika, Nizhalgal Ravi and Vani Viswanath. It was released on 8 November 1988.

Plot

Cast

Soundtrack 
The music was composed by Ilaiyaraaja, with lyrics by Vaali.

Reception 
The Indian Express compared the film's concept to Shahenshah, saying, "While the Amitabh starrer, despite all its brashness and its haywire climax had some points in its favour, one cannot justifiably clear the local brew". Jayamanmadhan of Kalki criticised the makers for not making the best use of the publicised high budget.

References

External links 
 

1980s Tamil-language films
1980s vigilante films
1988 action films
1988 films
Films directed by S. A. Chandrasekhar
Films scored by Ilaiyaraaja
Indian action films
Indian vigilante films